Serenade for Strings may refer to:

 Serenade for Strings (Carreño) (in E-flat major)
 Serenade for Strings (Chadwick) (in F major)
 Serenade for Strings (Dvořák) (in E major)
 Serenade for Strings (Elgar) (in E minor)
 Serenade for Strings (Foote) (in E major)
 Serenade for Strings (Herbert)
 Serenade for Strings (Kalinnikov) (in G minor)
 Serenade for Strings (Suk) (in E-flat major)
 Serenade for Strings (Straus) (in G minor)
 Serenade for Strings (Tchaikovsky) (in C major)
 Serenade for Strings (Wolf-Ferrari) (in E-flat major)